Montebello Bus Lines is a municipal bus operator in Montebello, California, USA, mainly serving East Los Angeles, Commerce, and Montebello.

History 
Montebello Bus Lines began on 28 July 1931, with a small lot on the corner of Greenwood Avenue and Olympic Boulevard, where the four buses the agency operated were housed. The conception of Montebello Bus Lines came after several other transport services had served the area.

Two years after the City of Montebello was incorporated in 1920, the City launched its first attempt at operating a municipal bus route. But the City then decided to sell its bus operation to the Motor Transport Company in 1928.

Three years later, in 1931, the City purchased the route back from the Motor Transport Company, and Montebello Bus Lines was born. In the agency's early days, passengers paid a nickel to ride the bus and bus operators earned $120 per month.

Montebello Bus Lines has grown to be the third largest municipal transport agency in Los Angeles County, operating seven local routes, an express route, a semi-fixed-route feeder service and a Dial-a-Ride service. Montebello Bus Lines serves 15 communities, providing transport to 8 million passengers on an annual basis.

As of September 2013, Montebello Bus Lines has 7 compressed natural gas (CNG) buses, 44 hybrid buses and plans to replace its 15 remaining diesel fuel buses with CNG in next few years. It also owns a CNG fuelling station to service the fleet.

The American Public Transportation Association (APTA) has recognised Montebello Bus Line's service. Montebello Bus Lines is the recipient of APTA's Outstanding Transport System Award and APTA's top Silver Safety Award in 1999, as well as the Achievement Award in 1997, 1998, 2000 and 2002.

Service area 
Within its service area of approximately 67 square kilometres, Montebello Bus Lines serving the communities of:

 Alhambra
 Bell Gardens
 Boyle Heights
 Commerce
 Downtown Los Angeles
 East Los Angeles
 La Mirada
 Montebello
 Monterey Park
 Pico Rivera
 Rosemead
 San Marino
 South Gate
 South San Gabriel
 Whittier

Fixed-route service 
Montebello Bus Lines consists of 8 routes in the San Gabriel Valley Central and West. Montebello Bus Lines fixed route services can broadly be divided into three types: Major Local Services, Minor Local Services, and Peak Express Service. Routes 10, 20, and 40 are the major service routes. Routes 30, 50, 60, and 70 are the minor service routes. Route 90 is the express route.

Route overview

Notes

Former Routes

343 Telegraph Road Express 
Former Route. Departs Gage Avenue and Telegraph Road to Downtown LA at 06:20 and 06:50. Departs from Downtown Los Angeles to Gage Avenue and Telegraph Road at 17:20 and 17:50.

In the early days of the Montebello Bus Lines, there was a route that had a bus stop in the middle of the 700 block of Bradshawe Street.

The buses used to be primarily blue, student riders of the bus affectionately called the Montebello Bus, "the big blue limousine."

Flexible Transport Services

Montebello Link 
Montebello Link begins operations in 1997. Montebello Bus Lines contracts five Metrolink feeder routes offers a curb-to-curb shuttle to and from the Montebello/Commerce Metrolink station during the peak hours. This reservation-based service utilizes shuttles that meet the Metrolink's arriving schedule in the morning and take passengers to major employment centers. The feeder routes also carry commuters back to the station in the afternoon.

Dial-A-Taxi 
The City of Montebello also operates Montebello Dial-A-Taxi since 2007, a programme which offers transport for elderly residents and qualified handicapped persons of any age and their attendants. 15,000 residents utilise this service.

References

External links 
 

Bus transportation in California
Public transportation in Los Angeles County, California
Eastside Los Angeles
Montebello, California
Pico Rivera, California
San Marino, California